Maximilian, Maximillian or Maximiliaan (Maximilien in French) is a male given name.

The name "Max" is considered a shortening of "Maximilian" as well as of several other names.

List of people

Monarchs
Maximilian I, Holy Roman Emperor (1459–1519)
Maximilian II, Holy Roman Emperor (1527–1576)
Maximilian I, Elector of Bavaria (1573–1651)
Maximilian II Emanuel, Elector of Bavaria (1662–1726)
Maximilian III Joseph, Elector of Bavaria (1727–1777)
Maximilian I Joseph of Bavaria (1756–1825)
Maximilian II of Bavaria (1811–1864)
Prince Maximilian of Baden (1867–1929)
Duke Maximilian Joseph in Bavaria (1808–1888)
Maximilian I of Mexico (1832–1867)

Other royalty
Maximilian, Hereditary Prince of Saxony (1759–1838)
Maximilian, Margrave of Baden (1933–2022)

Saints
Maximilian of Antioch (died ), Christian martyr
Maximilian of Lorch (died 288), Christian bishop and martyr
Maximilian of Tebessa (274–295), Christian martyr
Maximilian Kolbe (1894–1941), Polish Conventual Franciscan friar and martyr

Sportspeople
Max Aarons (born 2000), English footballer
Maximilian "Max" Baer (Maximilian Adelbert Baer), (1909-1959), American boxer and heavyweight champion
Maximilian Beister (born 1990), German footballer
Maximilian "Max" Chilton (born 1991), Indycar driver
Maximilian Dimitrovici (born 1989), German ice hockey player
Maximilian Ferrari (born 2000), Canadian soccer player
Maximilian Heidegger (born 1997), American-Israeli basketball player in the Israeli Basketball Premier League
Maximilian Günther (born 1997), German Formula E driver
Maximilian Levy (born 1987), German track cyclist
Maximilian Mbaeva (born 1989), Namibian footballer
Maximillian "Max" Schmeling (1905–2005), German boxer and heavyweight champion
Max Emilian Verstappen (born 1997), Formula 1 driver and a world champion (2021-2022)

Other people
 Maximilian (1936-2020), stage name of American musician Maxfield Crook
 Maximilian Apfelbaum (d.1953), Polish-born furrier who co-founded the New York furriers Maximilian.
 Max Baer Jr. (Maximilian Adalbert Baer Jr.), American actor, screenwriter, producer, and director
 Maximilian Grabner (1905–1948), Austrian Nazi Gestapo chief in Auschwitz executed for crimes against humanity
 Maximilian Hacman (1877–1961), Romanian academic 
 Maximilian List (1910 – c. 1980), German SS concentration camp commandant
 Maximilien Robespierre (1758–1794), politician in the French Revolution
 Maximilian Ronge (1874–1953), Austrian intelligence officer
 Maximilian Schell (1930–2014), Austrian-born Swiss actor
 Maximilian von Sevenborg ( – ), author
 Maximilian von Weichs (1881–1954), German field marshal

Fictional characters
 Maximillian, robot from the 1979 Disney motion picture The Black Hole
 Maximillian Arturo, a character from the television series Sliders
 Maximilien Aue, fictional SS officer from Jonathan Littell's novel The Kindly Ones
 Maximilian Bercovicz, fictional character from Once Upon A Time In America
 Maximilian Boisvert, Victorian Princess from menswear store Greenwoods
 Maximilian Goof is Max Goof's full name in Disney TV and film franchises
 Maximilian Jenius, fictional character from Macross
 Maximilian Morrel, the son of shipbuilder Pierre Morrel, from Alexandre Dumas' adventure novel The Count of Monte Cristo
 Maximillion Pegasus, fictional character on Yu-Gi-Oh!
 Maximilian Alanzo Ernesto Russo, also known as Max Russo, a character from Wizards of Waverly Place
 Maximilian Veers, Imperial general who led the assault on Echo Base in The Empire Strikes Back
 Maximilian (Maxie) Zeus, villain in Batman comic book series
 Tsar Maximilian, hero of the eponymous Russian folk-play

See also
 Maximilian, award-winning New York furriers founded around 1942.
Massimiliano
Maximilla
Maximiliano
Maximillion

English masculine given names

German masculine given names